The Divine Miss M is the debut studio album by American singer and actress Bette Midler, released in 1972 on the Atlantic Records label. The title of the album refers to Midler's famous stage persona. The album was co-produced by Barry Manilow, and includes several songs that since have become repertoire standards, such as "Do You Want to Dance?", "Chapel of Love", "Hello In There", "Friends" and "Boogie Woogie Bugle Boy". It was released on CD for the first time in 1990. A remastered version of the album was released by Atlantic Records/Warner Music in 1995. A remastered deluxe edition was released in October 2016.

The album was well received by public and critics and was certified Platinum in both United States and Canada.

Background, production and release
Midler began singing in the Continental Baths, a gay bathhouse in New York City's Ansonia Hotel, in the summer of 1970. During this time, she became close to her piano accompanist, Barry Manilow, who co-produced the album. It was during her time at the Continental Baths that she built up a core following and many of the album's songs were sung by her in her live performances.

The song "Bugle Boy" became a successful rock cover of the classic swing tune originally introduced and popularized in 1941 by the Andrews Sisters, to whom Midler has repeatedly referred as her idols and inspiration, as far back as her first appearances on The Tonight Show Starring Johnny Carson. Midler told Johnny Carson in an interview that she always wanted to move like the sisters, and Patty Andrews remembered: "When I first heard the introduction on the radio, I thought it was our old record. When Bette opened at the Amphitheater in Los Angeles, Maxene and I went backstage to see her. Her first words were, 'What else did you record? During another Midler concert, Maxene went on stage and presented her with an honorary bugle. Bette recorded other Andrews Sisters hits, including "In the Mood" and "Lullaby of Broadway". Several tracks were recorded for The Divine Miss M that did not make the final cut, like: "For Free," "He Was Too Good to Me," "Empty Bed Blues," "My Freedom And I," "I Shall Be Released," "A Teenager In Love," as well as "Old Cape Cod," and "Marijuana," which were later released on Bette's 3rd album, Songs For The New Depression. Early promotional DJ copies of the album featured “Hello in There” switched with “Daytime Hustler” but that was altered due to there being three emotional ballads all in the same side.

Critical reception

The album received acclaim by music critics. Mark Deming from AllMusic website wrote that "while Midler was and is best known for her outgoing stage persona, numbers like "Am I Blue" and "Do You Want to Dance?" demonstrate how much emotional heat she can bring to a torch song, and her interpretations of "Delta Dawn" and "Hello in There" are powerful, moving stuff, portraying their characters with a palpable compassion and nuance" he also said that the album "is her best album" because it "captured the many facets of her musical personality beautifully and showed her quirks were a rich part of what made her music so powerful." Music critic Robert Christgau gave the album an A− and pointed out that the album and the tracks selected are "a production that suggests its nutty quality without distracting from her voice, a rich instrument of surprising precision, simultaneously delicate and vulgar."

Commercial performance
The Divine Miss M reached the Top Ten on Billboards album chart and was later awarded a Platinum Disc by the RIAA, It featured three hit singles—"Do You Wanna Dance?", "Friends", and "Boogie Woogie Bugle Boy"—the third of which became Midler's first No. 1 Adult Contemporary hit. In 1973, the album won Midler a Grammy Award for Best New Artist. "Do You Want to Dance?", "Boogie Woogie Bugle Boy" and "Friends" were all Top 40 hit singles from the album, with "Boogie Woogie Bugle Boy" climbing to #8 on the Billboard Hot 100 and reaching #1 on Billboard's Adult Contemporary chart.

Track listing

Personnel

 Bette Midler – lead vocals
 Cissy Houston – backing vocals, track: A1
 Tender Loving Care (Renelle Broxton, Diedre Tuck, Beverly McKenzie) – backing vocals, track: A1
 Gail Kantor – backing vocals, tracks: A2 to A4, B3, B4, B6
 Melissa Manchester – backing vocals, tracks: A2 to A4, B3, B4, B6
 Merle Miller – backing vocals, tracks: A2 to A4, B3, B4, B6
 Barry Manilow – piano and rhythm track
 Pat Rebillot – piano, track B1
 Dickie Frank – guitar
 David Spinozza – guitars
 Ron Carter – bass guitar
 Michael Federal – bass guitar, backing vocals track B4
 Ray Lucas – drums
 Kevin Ellman – drums
 Ralph MacDonald – percussion instruments
 Thom Bell – horn and string arrangement, track A1
 Gene Orloff – violin, track B1
 Emanuel Green – violin, track B1
 Selwart Clarke – viola, track B1
 Kermit Moore – cello, track B1
 William S. Fischer – string arrangement, track B1
 Don Arnone – guitar, track B5
 Dick Hyman – piano, track B5
 Milt Hinton – bass, track B5
 Ted Sommer – drums, track B5
 Marty Nelson – vocal arranger, track B5
 Arif Mardin – arrangement, track B5

Production
 Ahmet Ertegün – producer, tracks: A2 to A4, B3, B4, B6
 Barry Manilow – producer, tracks: A2 to A4, B3, B4, B6
 Geoffrey Haslam – producer, tracks: A2 to A4, B3, B4, B6
 Joel Dorn – producer, tracks: A1, A5, B1, B2, B5
 Lew Hahn – recording engineer
 Barry Manilow – musical arranger, musical conductor
 Richard Amsel – cover illustration
 Richard Mantel – cover art direction & design
 Kenn Duncan – backliner photo
 Remixed by Geoffrey Haslam, Lew Hahn, Bob Liftin
 Remixed at Regent Sound Studios and Atlantic Studios
 Recorded at Atlantic Recording Studios, New York.

Charts

Certifications and sales

References

1972 debut albums
Bette Midler albums
Albums produced by Ahmet Ertegun
Albums produced by Joel Dorn
Atlantic Records albums